The Israel men's national water polo team is the representative for Israel in international men's water polo.

Results

World Championship
1973 — 16th place
1978 — 16th place
1986 — 15th place

European Championship
2022 — 12th place

References

Water polo
Men's national water polo teams
National water polo teams in Europe
National water polo teams by country
 
Men's sport in Israel